Head Set was an American alternative rock band based in California, United States.

History

Formation
Originally known as Don Knotts Overdrive (DKO), this Hollywood-based performance art/rock ensemble began their career in 1993, consisting of Howard Hallis (today, an artist), Taylor Stacy (Magic Pacer, Erin Martin Band, Deletists, Reverz Engineers, Electromagnetic), Bobby Hecksher (Charles Brown Superstar, Magic Pacer, The Warlocks), Bob Mustachio (Magic Pacer, The Warlocks) and Daniel Meyer (Dashboard Prophets, Farflung).

Originally visually and shock-rock based, dressing as monsters, superheroes, animals, naked, etc., the LA party band released a 7" single in 1994 on Wrong Dimension Records.

In 1995, Hallis and Hecksher left the group as their full-length CD debut was released nationally.

In 1997, the group recorded "Twisted Steel, Leather Donut," for the Orgazmo soundtrack album; a cover of the Devo song "Snowball" for the tribute album We Are Not Devo, and a version of Frankie Goes to Hollywood's "Relax" for Exene Cervenka's KPNK CD compilation soon followed.

Due to legal challenges from the actual Don Knotts, the group changed their name to Head Set.

The group, initially performing as DKO, played sold-out shows from Spaceland to the Whisky to The Viper Room. The reclusive four-piece instead signed an indie contract giving them more creative control. Centipede Records and Producer Jim Goodwin released "Brownout" with major college radio backing.

Discography
Orgazmo (soundtrack album, 1997) (track "Twisted Steel, Leather Donut")
Brownout (album, 2000)

Don Knotts Overdrive 
Don Knotts Overdrive (7" single, 1994)
The Patio Collection (compilation, 1995) (track "Electric Treechrome Disco Girl")
Juggernaut (album, 1996)
We Are Not Devo (tribute album, 1997) (track "Snowball")
KPNK (compilation, 1997) (track "Relax")
Hey Brother Volume 4  (compilation, 1998) (track "Asteroyd Lloyd")

References

External links

Alternative rock groups from California
Musical groups established in 1996
Musical groups disestablished in 2001